Baldovino Dassù (born 3 November 1952) is an Italian golfer.

Dassù won the 1970 British Youths Open Amateur Championship and played for Italy in that year's Eisenhower Trophy. He turned professional in 1971 and was a regular on the European Tour from its first official season in 1972 until the mid-1980s. His most successful season by far was 1976, when he won his only two European Tour titles at the Dunlop Masters and the Italian Open, which he won by eight shots, and went on to finish ninth on the Order of Merit. Off the tour he won the Italian Professional Championship in 1974, 1976 and 1977. He represented Italy in the Alfred Dunhill Cup twice and in the World Cup of Golf four times.

As a senior, Dassù played the European Seniors Tour for one season, finishing 26th on the 2003 Order of Merit.

Professional wins (9)

European Tour wins (2)

Alps Tour wins (1)
2001 Executive Group Modena Open

Other wins (7)
This list may be incomplete
1974 Italian National Professional Championship
1976 Italian National Professional Championship
1977 Italian National Professional Championship
1983 Italian PGA Championship, Open dei Tessali
1985 Cerutti Open
1988 Open dei Tessali

Results in major championships

Note: Dassu only played in The Open Championship.

CUT = missed the half-way cut (3rd round cut in 1972 and 1978 Open Championships)
"T" = tied

Team appearances
Amateur
European Amateur Team Championship  (representing Italy): 1969
Eisenhower Trophy (representing Italy): 1970
St Andrews Trophy (representing the Continent of Europe): 1970

Professional
World Cup (representing Italy): 1976, 1979, 1980, 1982
Marlboro Nations' Cup/Philip Morris International (representing Italy): 1972, 1976
Hennessy Cognac Cup (representing the Continent of Europe): 1976, 1978, 1980, 1982, (representing Italy) 1984
Double Diamond International (representing Continental Europe): 1977
Dunhill Cup (representing Italy): 1986

References

External links

Italian male golfers
European Tour golfers
European Senior Tour golfers
Sportspeople from Florence
1952 births
Living people